Scott Tyner (born April 11, 1972 in Houston, Texas) is a former punter who played 5 seasons in the National Football League for the Atlanta Falcons. Tyner attended Oklahoma State and Trinity Valley Community College after high school in Edgewood, Texas.

References

1972 births
Living people
People from Houston
People from Van Zandt County, Texas
American football punters
Trinity Valley Cardinals football players
Oklahoma State Cowboys football players
Atlanta Falcons players